Suregada multiflora, sometimes called the "false lime tree", is a species in the family Euphorbiaceae.  The Catalogue of Life lists no subspecies.  It is found in tropical Asia: names include kén or mân mây in Viet Nam.

Gallery

References

External links 
 
 

Suregada
Flora of Indo-China
Trees of Indo-China
Trees of Vietnam
Taxa named by Henri Ernest Baillon
Taxa named by Adrien-Henri de Jussieu